Cyclas may refer to:
 Cyclas (garment), a garment worn in Europe during the Middle Age
 Cyclas (beetle), a genus of true weevils
 Cyclas, a synonym for Crudia, a genus of plants
 Cyclas, a synonym for Sphaerium, a genus of freshwater clams